The Kwara State College of Education, Oro is a state government higher education institution located in Oro, Kwara State, Nigeria. It is affiliated to Ekiti State University for its degree programmes. The current provost is Mukaila Ayanda Aremu.

History 
The Kwara State College of Education, Oro was established in 1976.

Courses 
The institution offers the following courses:

 Arabic
 Primary Education Studies
 Chemistry Education
 Business Education
 Islamic Studies
 Computer Education
 French
 Hausa
 Christian Religious Studies
 Education and Mathematics
 Education and English Language
 Education and Yoruba
 Economics
 Education and French
 History
 Education and Integrated Science
 Social Studies
 Geography
 Early Childhood Care Education
 Education and Political Science
 Physical And Health Education
 Fine And Applied Arts
 Education and Social Studies
 Agricultural Science Education
 Nursery and Primary Education
 Biology Education

References 

Universities and colleges in Nigeria
1976 establishments in Nigeria
Educational institutions established in 1976